Astronarium is a Polish documentary and popular science television series about astronomy and space research. The program is produced by the Polish Television and Polish Astronomical Society, with support from the Polish Ministry of Science and Higher Education. The series premiered on March 2, 2015 on the TVP Regionalna channel (now the name of this channel is TVP 3). It has been broadcast on various channels in Poland and abroad, including TVP 1, TVP 3, TVP Polonia. The episodes are also available on the internet as a VOD, some of them with English subtitles. The cumulative audience in Poland during the first week of emission of an episode is on the level of 500 000 viewers (RCH parameter).

The first season of 8 episodes was first broadcast from March to April 2015, the second season of 13 episodes from September 2015 to March 2016, the third season of 13 episodes started in April 2016.

Format of the series is about visiting science institutes and astronomical observatories, where scientists involved in research are explaining various topics about astronomy and space research. The serie uses also CGI renderings, video footages, photographs. Each episode is about a particular topic.

Astronarium is also available at YouTube where it reached 100,000 subscribers on 23 October 2020, and the most popular episode reached 1 million views on 18 October 2020.

On January 15, 2018, Astronarium was a winner in "Media" category of the "Popularyzator Nauki 2017" contest organized by the Polish Press Agency and the Ministry of Science and Higher Education. Astronarium received Silver YouTube Creator Award in 2020.

Season 1 
List of episodes:

Season 2 
List of episodes:

Season 3 
List of episodes:

Season 4 
List of episodes:

Season 5 
List of episodes:

Season 6 
List of episodes

Season 7 
List of episodes

References

External links 
 Official website
 Episodes available on-line
 Episodes with English subtitles
 Astronarium channel at YouTube with archive of episodes

Science education television series
Astronomy education television series